Through the Air (French title: La résistance de l'air) is a 2015 French-Belgian drama film directed by Fred Grivois. The film concerns an air rifle champion who becomes embroiled in a dangerous plot after accepting a well-paid job offer. The film stars Reda Kateb and Ludivine Sagnier.

Cast
 Reda Kateb as Vincent Cavelle
 Ludivine Sagnier as Delphine Cavelle
 Tchéky Karyo as Armand Cavelle
 Johan Heldenbergh as Renaud
Laure de Clermont-Tonnerre as Valérie
 Blanche Hemada Costoso as Alexia Cavelle
 Pascal Demolon as JP
 Sylvie Degryse as Evelyne
 Patrice Guillain as The assailant
 Hubert Saint-Macary as Armand's neighbour
 Jehon Gorani as Bob
 Damien Bonnard as A worker
 Lahcen Elmazouzi as The Turkish man
 Stella Mancini as Business woman

References

External links
 

2015 films
2015 drama films
2010s French-language films
French drama films
Belgian drama films
Gaumont Film Company films
Films with screenplays by Thomas Bidegain
2015 directorial debut films
French-language Belgian films
2010s French films